A dumpling is a cooked ball of dough.

Dumpling, dumplin', or dumplings may also refer to:

 Dumplin' (2015), a young adult novel
 Dumplin' (film), a 2018 film adaptation of the novel
 Dumplings (film), a 2004 Hong Kong film
 "Dumplings" (song), by Pink Guy 
 The Dumplings (TV series), 1976
 The Dumplings, Polish electronic music duo
 OnePlus 5T, a smartphone codenamed "dumpling"
 Dumpling Creek, a stream in Missouri, USA
 Fort Dumpling, American Revolutionary War site
 Sweet dumpling squash, a cultivar of cucurbita pepo